Turkey participates in the 2018 Mediterranean Games held in Tarragona, Spain from 22 June to 1 July 2018. 349 athletes, including 205 male and 144 female, from Turkey were registered to compete in 31 sports at the Games.

Medal table

Archery

Men

Women

Athletics

Men

Women

Paralympic  Athletics

Badminton

Men
 Group stage

Women

Group stage

Basketball 3x3

Men's tournament

Team

Mehmet Fırat Alemdaroğlu
Mert Başdan
Tanalp Şengün
Utku Saraloğlu

Group D

Turkey men's team did not advance to the quarterfinals, ranked 13th.

Women's tournament
Team
Betül Erkoyuncu
Büşra Akbaş
Derin Yaya
Ezgi Manlacı

Turkey women's team did not advance to the quarterfinals, ranked 6th.

Beach volleyball

Men's tournament 

 Hasan Hüseyin Mermer / Sefa Urlu 

 Murat Giginoğlu / Volkan Göğteper

Women's tournament 

 Selin Yurtsever / Neriman Özsoy Gençyürek Didnot advance to the quarterfinals.

 Aleyna Vence / Merve Nezir Did not advance to the semifinal.

Bowls

Men

 Faik Dursun Öztürk – Lyonnaise – Precision throw Did not qualify

 Burak Altay – Lyonnaise – Progressive throw Did not qualify

 İbrahim Arslantaş Petanque – Precision throw Did not advance to the semifinal

 Mustafa Yılmaz – Petanque – Precision throw Did not qualify

 İbrahim Arslantaş / Mustafa Yılmaz – Petanque – Doubles Did not advance to the quarterfinal

 Cem Şimşek – Raffa – Individual Did not advance to the quarterfinal

Women

 İnci Ece Öztürk – Lyonnaise – Progressive throw 

 Seda Şenol – Lyonnaise – Precision throw Did not qualify

 Gülçin Çelik – Petanque – Precision throw 

 Gamze Özgün Çağlar / Gülçin Çelik – Petanque – Doubles

Boxing

Canoeing

Men

Women

Cycling

Men

Women

Equestrian

Fencing

Women
İrem Karamete – Individual foil Did not advance to the quarterfinals

Firuze Aysen Güneş – Individual foil Did not advance to the quarterfinals

Iryna Shchukla Çiçek – Individual sable Did not advance to the quarterfinals

Nisanur Erbil – Individual sable Did not advance to the quarterfinals

Football

Men's tournament

Group C

Preliminary round

Golf

Men

Women

Gymnastics, artistic

Men

Women

Gymnastics, rhythmic 

Qualification

Final

Handball

Men's tournament
Turkey men's team ranked 4th.

Preliminary round
Group D

Quarterfinal

Semifinal

Women's tournament

Turkey women's team ranked 5th.

Preliminary round
Group B

Rank for 5–6

Judo

Men

Women

Karate

Men

Women

Rowing

Sailing

Men

Women 

Coaches  Joško Lalić,  Jaroslaw Mierczyński,  Jonasz Stelmaszyk.

Shooting

Men

Women

Swimming

Men

Women

Paralympic Swimming

Table tennis

Men
Round robin

Knockout

Women

Round robin

Knockout

Taekwondo

 Legend

 OT — Won on over time (Golden Point)
 PTG — Won by Points Gap
 SUP — Won by superiority

Men

Women

Tennis

Men

Women

Triathlon

Men 
Individual sprint

Women 
Individual sprint

Volleyball

Men's tournament
Turkey men's national volleyball team ranked 7th.

Preliminary round
Group D

|}

|}

Classification 5–8

|}

7th place game

|}

Women's tournament
Turkey women's national volleyball team - 

Preliminary round
Group B

|}

|}

Quarterfinals

|}

Semifinals

|}

Third place game

|}

Water polo

Men's tournament
Turkey men's national water polo team ranked 8th.

Preliminary round

Group B

7th place game

Women's tournament
Turkey women's national water polo team ranked 6th.

Preliminary round
Group B

5th place game

Water skiing

Men

Women

Weightlifting

Men

Women

Wrestling

Men
Freestyle

Greco-Roman

Women
Freestyle

References

External links
2018 Mediterranean Games at Turkish Olympic Committee
Turkey at the 2018 Mediterranean Games official web sitr
Results

Nations at the 2018 Mediterranean Games
2018
Mediterranean Games